Hodilje is a village located in the municipality of Ston, in the Dubrovnik-Neretva County, Croatia. The village is situated on the Pelješac peninsula.

Geography

Hodilje is located at 42° 51' 25N and 17° 41' 22E. It is divided into 4 parts: Hodilje, Malo Selo, Luka and Rusan. Hodilje lies near the Zjat hill and the sea coast. Almost all villagers are fishermen. There is an old church dedicated to St John in the village.

Family names of the villagers

The family names of the villagers include: Bajurin, Krile, Ficović, Antunica, Kokotić, Garbin, Mjehović, Vukašin, Delo, Ljubić (Tupanović), Glunčić, Car, Dražeta, Kolunđija, Dropuljić, Glavinić, Marinović, Kitin, Katić, Đuračić, Pavlović, Franušić, Prkut, etc.

See also
 Dubrovnik-Neretva County
 Dalmatia
 Pelješac

References

Dr Nikola Zvonimir Bjelovučić, Poluostrvo Rat (Pelješac), Naselja i poreklo stanovništva, knjiga 11, Beograd, 1922.

External links
 Hodilje - location map

Populated places in Dubrovnik-Neretva County